Ragley Hall in the parish of Arrow in Warwickshire is a stately home, located south of Alcester and eight miles (13 km) west of Stratford-upon-Avon. It is the ancestral seat of the Seymour-Conway family, Marquesses of Hertford.

History

The house was built by Edward Conway, 1st Earl of Conway (1623–1683) to the designs of William Hurlbert, with modifications by Robert Hooke and was completed after his death in 1683. The interior was subsequently modified on at least three occasions, to the designs of James Gibbs circa 1750–56; of James Wyatt circa 1778–83 and of  William Tasker circa 1871–73.

It became the home of Anne Conway and she was visited there by a number of notable people including Gottfried Wilhelm Leibniz, Thomas Vaughan, Lilias Skene, Henry More, Ezechiel Foxcroft, Elizabeth of Bohemia and Christian Knorr von Rosenroth. Franciscus Mercurius van Helmont was Anne's physician from 1671 until her death in 1679.

The secondary seat of the Seymour-Conway family, Earls of Hertford, was Sudbourne Hall in Suffolk and their London townhouse was Hertford House. Financial instability of the Seymour family left the house threatened with demolition more than once. In 1912, following the death of Hugh Seymour, 6th Marquess of Hertford, the estate's trustees recommended that the house be demolished. However, during World War I and World War II, the house found use as a military hospital. Hugh Seymour, 8th Marquess of Hertford, who in 1940 inherited Ragley Hall from his uncle George Seymour, 7th Marquess of Hertford, fought to save it after the war. It was refurbished between 1956 and 1958, when it became one of the first stately homes opened to the public.

In 1983, the painter Graham Rust completed a huge mural including pets, friends and family members which is known as "The Temptation" and is exhibited on the Southern staircase.

Ragley was the site of the Jerwood Sculpture Park, opened in July 2004. The Park included works that won the Jerwood Sculpture Prizes, and the work of Dame Elisabeth Frink, among others. However the site was closed in April 2012.

In popular culture
Ragley Hall has occasionally been used as a location for filming, including: the 1982 television version of The Scarlet Pimpernel; the fourth episode of the second series of the science fiction television series Doctor Who, titled "The Girl in the Fireplace", first broadcast in May 2006; and the fourth season of the Netflix series "The Crown".

References

External links

 Ragley Hall website
 Alcester & Ragley Park Cricket Club
 Jerwood Sculpture Park

Buildings and structures completed in 1680
Houses completed in the 17th century
Country houses in Warwickshire
Grade I listed buildings in Warwickshire
Grade I listed houses
Historic house museums in Warwickshire
Gardens in Warwickshire
Art museums and galleries in Warwickshire
Gardens by Capability Brown
1680 establishments in England